Joseph Berio (14 June 1895 – 1 May 1958) was a French racing cyclist. He rode in the 1925 Tour de France.

References

1895 births
1958 deaths
French male cyclists
Place of birth missing